Joseph John Henke (25 June 1903 – 31 October 1988) was an Australian rules footballer who played with St Kilda in the Victorian Football League (VFL).

Notes

External links 

1903 births
1988 deaths
Australian rules footballers from Victoria (Australia)
St Kilda Football Club players